The Orione class  was a class of four sea-going steam-powered torpedo boats of the Italian Regia Marina (Royal Navy) built by the Odero shipyard of Sestri Ponente from 1905 to 1907. They served in the Italo-Turkish War and the First World War.

Construction and design
On 31 March 1905, four torpedo boats were laid down at the Italian shipbuilder Odero's Sestri Ponente, Genoa shipyard. They were fitted with a slightly unusual clipper bow (a bow that curves forward as it rises from the water) and two closely spaced funnels.

Crew was three officers and 35 men.

Service
The four ships of the class were completed from February 1907 to April 1908. Although the ships reached speeds of up to  during sea trials, they were less seaworthy than the ships of the Pegaso class. Olimpia and Orfeo were deployed in relief efforts following the 1908 Messina earthquake that devastated Sicily and Calabria on 28 December 1908. Orione collided with the old coastal torpedo boat 128 S in April 1911.  All four ships of the class were active during the Italo-Turkish War, serving in Libyan waters and in the Dodecanese.

During the First World War, the class formed the 1st Torpedo Boat Division, carrying out escort operations in Libyan waters, and between North Africa and Italy. Their armament was modified during the war, with the 47 mm guns replaced by two 76 mm guns and one of the torpedo tubes removed. Orfeo was badly damaged in a collision with the merchant ship Calabria on 10 December 1917, but was repaired. They were disposed of between 1920 and 1923.

Ships

Notes

Citations

References

External links
 Orione-class torpedo Marina Militare website

Torpedo boats of the Regia Marina
World War I naval ships of Italy